Abdul Hamid Khan may refer to:

Maulana Abdul Hamid Khan Bhashani (1880–1976), nicknamed Red Maulana, leader of his own faction of National Awami Party
Abdul Hamid Khan Dasti, former Chief Minister of Punjab, Pakistan
Abdul Hamid Khan (badminton) (born 1965), Singaporean badminton player
Abdul Hamid Khan (general), Deputy and acting Commander-in-Chief of Pakistan Army during Bangladesh Liberation War and Indo-Pakistani War of 1971
Abdul Hamid Khan (politician) (born 1964), Chairman of the Balawaristan National Front (Hameed Group) BNF-H
Abdul Hamid Khan (politician, born 1900), Malaysian politician

See also
 Abdul Hamid, for sultans of that name